Lycée Camille Pissarro is a senior high school/sixth-form college in Pontoise, Val-d'Oise, France, in the Paris metropolitan area.

Planning for the school began in 1953 and it was first established in 1959.

References

Further reading
 "L'Inauguration du Lycée." Avenir de l’Ile de France. 8 December 1959.

External links
 Lycée Camille Pissarro 

Cergy-Pontoise
Lycées in Val-d'Oise
1959 establishments in France
Educational institutions established in 1959